Tahuna is a small rural settlement located 18 km north of Morrinsville. In the Māori language Tahuna means sandbank, likely to refer to the sandbanks along the nearby Piako River, where a Māori settlement started.  Tahuna is seen as the upper limit for navigatable travel on the Piako River. The settlement has a rugby club, a lawn bowls club, a golf course and various shops.

A town water supply was proposed in the 1980s and installed in the 2000s.

There are two marae in the Tahuna area. The Waiti-Raungaunu marae and Paoa meeting house are also associated with the Waikato Tainui hapū of Ngāti Makirangi, and with the iwi of Ngāti Paoa. Hoe o Tainui marae and surrounding settlement is affiliated with Ngāti Makirangi.

Demographics
The SA1 area is part of the larger Tahuna-Mangateparu statistical area.

Tahuna had a population of 183 at the 2018 New Zealand census, a decrease of 12 people (−6.2%) since the 2013 census, and an increase of 3 people (1.7%) since the 2006 census. There were 72 households, comprising 93 males and 90 females, giving a sex ratio of 1.03 males per female. The median age was 40.1 years (compared with 37.4 years nationally), with 36 people (19.7%) aged under 15 years, 39 (21.3%) aged 15 to 29, 72 (39.3%) aged 30 to 64, and 33 (18.0%) aged 65 or older.

Ethnicities were 90.2% European/Pākehā, 8.2% Māori, 1.6% Pacific peoples, and 8.2% Asian. People may identify with more than one ethnicity.

Although some people chose not to answer the census's question about religious affiliation, 63.9% had no religion, 24.6% were Christian, 1.6% had Māori religious beliefs, 6.6% were Hindu, 1.6% were Buddhist and 1.6% had other religions.

Of those at least 15 years old, 15 (10.2%) people had a bachelor's or higher degree, and 48 (32.7%) people had no formal qualifications. The median income was $32,700, compared with $31,800 nationally. 15 people (10.2%) earned over $70,000 compared to 17.2% nationally. The employment status of those at least 15 was that 75 (51.0%) people were employed full-time, 18 (12.2%) were part-time, and 3 (2.0%) were unemployed.

Tahuna-Mangateparu statistical area

Tahuna-Mangateparu had a population of 1,569 at the 2018 New Zealand census, an increase of 78 people (5.2%) since the 2013 census, and an increase of 150 people (10.6%) since the 2006 census. There were 567 households, comprising 816 males and 753 females, giving a sex ratio of 1.08 males per female. The median age was 37.1 years (compared with 37.4 years nationally), with 384 people (24.5%) aged under 15 years, 267 (17.0%) aged 15 to 29, 729 (46.5%) aged 30 to 64, and 189 (12.0%) aged 65 or older.

Ethnicities were 89.5% European/Pākehā, 13.2% Māori, 1.7% Pacific peoples, 3.6% Asian, and 2.5% other ethnicities. People may identify with more than one ethnicity.

The percentage of people born overseas was 12.4, compared with 27.1% nationally.

Although some people chose not to answer the census's question about religious affiliation, 57.4% had no religion, 30.4% were Christian, 0.8% had Māori religious beliefs, 1.0% were Hindu, 0.4% were Muslim, 0.2% were Buddhist and 2.1% had other religions.

Of those at least 15 years old, 153 (12.9%) people had a bachelor's or higher degree, and 291 (24.6%) people had no formal qualifications. The median income was $38,700, compared with $31,800 nationally. 213 people (18.0%) earned over $70,000 compared to 17.2% nationally. The employment status of those at least 15 was that 678 (57.2%) people were employed full-time, 198 (16.7%) were part-time, and 30 (2.5%) were unemployed.

Education

The school opened in 1905.

References 

Populated places in Waikato
Matamata-Piako District